Mamers is an unincorporated community and census-designated place (CDP) in Harnett County, North Carolina, United States. The population was 826 at the 2010 census. It is a part of the Dunn Micropolitan Area, which is also a part of the greater Raleigh–Durham–Cary Combined Statistical Area (CSA) as defined by the United States Census Bureau.

Geography
The community is in west-central Harnett County in Upper Little River Township. U.S. Route 421 is the main road through the northern side of the community, and Old US Highway 421 runs through the center. Immediate neighbors of Mamers are Luart to the east and Ryes to the west.

Prominent nearby landmarks include the community United States Post Office (ZIP Code 27552). Mamers is in the Boone Trail Elementary School district as well as in the Western Harnett middle and high school districts.

Demographics

References

Census-designated places in Harnett County, North Carolina
Census-designated places in North Carolina
Unincorporated communities in North Carolina